I Want Him Dead is a 1968 Italian-Spanish Spaghetti Western film directed by Paolo Bianchini  and starring Craig Hill.

Cast

References

External links

Spanish Western (genre) films
Spaghetti Western films
1968 Western (genre) films
1968 films
Films directed by Paolo Bianchini
Films scored by Nico Fidenco
Films shot in Almería
Plaion
1960s Italian films